Alpha Kappa Delta is a non-secret, democratic organization founded in 1920 by Dr. Emory S. Bogardus. It is an international honor society of sociology, and has over 80,000 members and more than 490 chapters established around the world.

History and founders

In 1915, Emory S. Bogardus formed one of the earliest sociological departments in the U.S. at the University of Southern California.  He decided a sociological society needed to be created to meet the needs of students and faculty for discussing ongoing sociological projects. With the help of fourteen graduate students and other members of the sociology department, Dr. Bogardus officially formed Alpha Kappa Delta on November 21, 1920. The symbol of Alpha Kappa Delta was adopted the same year and designed by Dr. Melvin J. Vincent.  While other sociological clubs were formed around this time, AKD was the first to limit membership to only those with a serious interest in sociology and pursuing superior scholarships.

Alpha Kappa Delta's name originated from the first letters of three Greek words:

 Anthropon, which translates to "humankind". 
 Katamanthanein, which translates to "to investigate thoroughly". 
 Diakonesein, which translates to "for the purpose of service".

In 1921, Bogardus contacted a select group of universities around the country, inviting them to form similar organizations. Three schools responded by creating their own AKD chapters; the University of Wisconsin, Northwestern University, and the University of Kansas.  These three schools, along with the University of Southern California, became the United Chapters of Alpha Kappa Delta in 1924.

Purpose
Alpha Kappa Delta's primary goal is to advance social research for the purpose of service.  The original aim of the group was to address a need for students and faculty to share current or completed research projects pertaining to sociology. Once the first chapter was formed by Dr. Bogardus, the organization worked to actively expand to other universities and on an international scale.

Current representatives and members
Alpha Kappa Delta operates with a select system of officers who each have specific duties to perform for the organization. These positions include president, president-elect, vice president, secretary/treasurer, and the editor of Sociological Inquiry.

Other representatives of the AKD are regional representatives. These members serve to attend council meetings and maintain communication with chapter representatives from the region they represent.

Membership

In order for colleges and other institutions to establish a chapter, the institution's sociology department must hold at least two full-time professors of sociology. Also, the representing Sociology Department must offer a minimum of 60 semester hours of standard courses in the field of sociology. (This does not include summer sessions or extended teaching offerings).

Membership in Alpha Kappa Delta spans a lifetime. Members receive a one-year subscription to the Social Inquiry, the scientific journal of the AKD. Elections into Alpha Kappa Delta are undertaken without regard to race, creed, or national origin; and membership requires no oath, vow, or pledge. Once membership is acquired, a certificate of membership is given in hope that new members will make the ideals of Alpha Kappa Delta their own.

In order to gain membership into Alpha Kappa Delta as an undergraduate, one must abide by the following requirements 
 Shall be an officially declared sociology or a serious interest in sociology.
 Shall be at least a junior (third year) by the standards of the host institution.
 Shall have accumulated an overall grade point average of 3.3 at the host institution.
 Shall have maintained the equivalent of a 3.0-grade point average in sociology.
 Shall have completed at least four sociology courses initiation.

As a graduate student, one must complete half a year of graduate school study in sociology while obtaining a grade point average of B or better. The student must also be continuing their matriculation in a program of study working toward their graduate degree in sociology.

Staff members of the host institution must obtain a Ph.D. in sociology or be currently employed as a sociologist at the host institution prior to initiation.

Foundation
The name Alpha Kappa Delta was chosen by the society's founder Dr. Emory Bogardus. That same year the logo was designed by Dr. Melvin J. Vincent. In 1924 Gertrude A. Stephens wrote the lyrics to Alpha Kappa Delta's hymn in conjunction with Charles H. Gabriel who wrote the music. During the 1930s and 1940s the leaders of Alpha Kappa Delta namely Kimball Young, Reed Bain, and L.L. Bernard attempted to increase membership. This effort was tested by World War II which dropped both membership and attendance at organizational meetings. L.L. Bernard lead Alpha Kappa Delta through these trying years until A.B. Hollingshead was elected Alpha Kappa Delta's president in 1948.

Awards
MFP (Minority Fellowship Program)
This award is given to a sociologist of color. It is funded by annual contributions from organizations including Alpha Kappa Delta, Sociologists for Women Society, Association for Black Sociologists, Southwestern Sociological Association, along with membership donations. This award is designed to ensure a diverse and highly trained workforce to assume leadership roles in research that is relevant to today's society.
Alpha Kappa Delta Outstanding Faculty Award
The Alpha Kappa Delta outstanding faculty award is given annually by students in A.K.D. to a faculty member in the Sociology or Criminal Justice Department.

References

External links
 Alpha Kappa Delta official website
 Alpha Kappa Delta

Association of College Honor Societies
Student organizations established in 1920
1920 establishments in California
University of Southern California